The Wiru are a people of the Southern Highlands Province of Papua New Guinea. They speak the Wiru language. Among their rituals is the production of timbuwarra out of rattan.

Wiru  ancestors said to be much taller than modern population and are referred as "giants".
It is alleged that bones of these ancestors can be found on mountain tops between Soaru Range and confluence of the Polu and Tua rivers.

References

External Links 

 Andrew Strathern and Pamela J. Stewart Recordings From the Andrew Strathern and Pamela J. Stewart Photographs and Audiorecordings. MSS 477. Special Collections & Archives, UC San Diego.

Ethnic groups in Papua New Guinea